This is a list of articles, or subsections of articles, about music inspired by literature.

 Musical settings of, or music inspired by, poems by Byron
 Edgar Allan Poe and music
 Music related to Anne Rice's novels
 Works inspired by J. R. R. Tolkien
 Music based on the works of Oscar Wilde
 List of songs based on poems
 Romeo and Juliet (Prokofiev)
 A Midsummer Night's Dream (Mendelssohn)

See also
 Lists of music by theme

References